All I Know So Far: Setlist is the second live album by American singer Pink, and soundtrack to the documentary film Pink: All I Know So Far. It was released on May 21, 2021, by RCA Records.

Track listing

Charts

Weekly charts

Year-end charts

Release history

References

2021 live albums
Pink (singer) albums
RCA Records live albums